Tamara Pangelova (later Dunaiska, born 22 August 1943) is a retired Ukrainian middle-distance runner who specialized in the 1500 m event. She won a bronze medal at the 1971 European Championships and set a world record on 12 March 1972, both indoors. She won a gold medal at the 1972 European indoor championships in Grenoble. Later in 1972 she placed seventh at the Munich Olympics.

References

1943 births
Living people
Olympic athletes of the Soviet Union
Athletes (track and field) at the 1972 Summer Olympics
Ukrainian female middle-distance runners
Sportspeople from Poltava
Soviet female middle-distance runners